Gavazzana is a frazione of Cassano Spinola in the Province of Alessandria in the Italian region Piedmont, located about  southeast of Turin and about  southeast of Alessandria.  It was a separate commune until 1 January 2018.
  

Cities and towns in Piedmont